Nancy Lynn Dunkle (born January 10, 1955) is a former American basketball player who competed in the 1976 Summer Olympics. Dunkle was inducted into the Women's Basketball Hall of Fame in 2000.

USA Basketball
The 6ft 2in tall Dunkle was named to the team representing the US at the 1973 World University Games competition in Moscow, Soviet Union. It was the eighth such competition, but the first one in which the USA competed in women's basketball. The USA team had to play the Soviet Union in the opening round, and lost to the hosts, 92–43. The USA team bounced back and won their next two games. After preliminary play, the teams moved into medal rounds, where the first round loss carried over. In the medal round, the USA won their next three games, including a match against 6–0 Cuba, which the USA won 59–44. That sent them to the gold medal game, but against the host Soviet Union, now 7–0. The USSR won to capture the gold medal, while the USA finished with a silver in their first competition.

In 1975 Dunkle played for the USA team in the Pan American Games held in Mexico City, Mexico. The USA team had finished second in 1967 and 1971, but won all seven games at the 1975 event to capture their first gold medal since 1963.

Dunkle earned a spot on the USA National team, which  competed in the 1975 World Championships held in Cali, Colombia. The USA team lost their opening round game by two points to Japan 73–71. After winning the next game, they faced Czechoslovakia who won by a single point 66–65. This sent the USA team to the consolation rounds, where they won three of four, but dropped a game to Canada 74–68. The USA finished the competition in eighth place.

Dunkle continued with the National team to the 1976 Olympics, held in Montreal, Quebec, Canada. After losing the opening game to Japan, the USA team beat Bulgaria, but then faced host team Canada. Dunkle was the leading scorer for the USA team with 17 points, helping the USA team defeat Canada 84–71. After losing to the USSR, the USA team needed a victory against Czechoslovakia to secure a medal. Dunkle scored 14 points, to help the team to an 83–67 win and the silver medal.

Cal State Fullerton statistics
Source

References

External links
Women's Basketball Hall of Fame

1955 births
Living people
All-American college women's basketball players
American women's basketball players
Basketball players at the 1975 Pan American Games
Basketball players at the 1976 Summer Olympics
Basketball players from Maryland
Cal State Fullerton Titans women's basketball players
Medalists at the 1976 Summer Olympics
Olympic silver medalists for the United States in basketball
Pan American Games gold medalists for the United States
Pan American Games medalists in basketball
Universiade medalists in basketball
Universiade silver medalists for the United States
Medalists at the 1973 Summer Universiade
Medalists at the 1975 Pan American Games
Cal State Fullerton Titans women's basketball coaches
United States women's national basketball team players
Women's Professional Basketball League coaches
Women's Professional Basketball League players